Vrljaj (Cyrillic: Врљај) is a village in the municipality of Donji Vakuf, Bosnia and Herzegovina.

Demographics 
According to the 2013 census, its population was nil, down from 5 in 1991.

References

Populated places in Donji Vakuf